HMS Redgauntlet was an  destroyer which served with the Royal Navy. Launched on 2 July 1916, the ship operated as part of the Harwich Force during World War I and then, after the War, with the Home Fleet. While taking part in an anti-submarine patrol on 21 May 1917, the ship struck a mine but, although severely damaged, was able to return to England for repairs. Subsequently, the destroyer joined the anti-submarine school at Portsmouth before being sold to be broken up on 16 December 1926 after less than ten years service.

Design and development

Redgauntlet was one of three  destroyers ordered by the British Admiralty from William Denny and Brothers on 17 July 1915 as part of the Sixth War Construction Programme at a cost of cost £159,200 each. The design was generally similar to the preceding  destroyers, although equipped with geared turbines to improve efficiency, raising the central gun mounted on a bandstand and having minor changes to improve seakeeping. Three funnels were fitted. The ship's complement was 82 officers and ratings.

Armament consisted of three  Mk IV QF guns on the ship's centreline, with one on the forecastle, one aft on a raised platform and one between the second and third funnels. A single 2-pounder (40 mm) pom-pom anti-aircraft gun was carried. Torpedo armament consisted of two twin mounts for  torpedoes mounted aft and two individual tubes for  torpedoes fixed on the beam.

Construction and career
Redgauntlet was laid down by William Denny and Brothers at Dumbarton on the River Clyde on 30 September 1915 with the yard number 1057. Launching took place on 23 November 1916, the destroyer leaving the yard on 27 January and being delivered on 7 February 1917.

On commissioning, Redgauntlet joined the 10th Destroyer Flotilla of the Harwich Force. The Harwich Force was heavily committed to escorting merchant vessels, but casualties through conflict with the enemy were rare. For example, on 10 May 1917, a large contingent of destroyers from the Force were escorting a Dutch convoy from the Hook of Holland when they encountered twelves German torpedo boats. Despite the expenditure of much ammunition, no hits were obtained on either side. However, later that month, on 21 May, the destroyer struck a British mine while on patrol looking for submarines in the English Channel. Despite being severely damaged, Redgauntlet returned to Sheerness for repairs and was soon back in service.

At the dissolution of the Harwich Force after the war, Redgauntlet was reassigned to the 4th Destroyer Flotilla under  as part of the newly formed Home Fleet. Subsequently, the ship was allocated to the anti-submarine school at Portsmouth and was involved in the development of ASDIC. However, in 1923, the Navy decided to scrap many of the older destroyers in preparation for the introduction of newer and larger vessels. Redgauntlet was one of the destroyers chosen for retirement. In July 1927, the destroyer was sold to J.J. King of Garston and broken up.

Pennant numbers

References

Citations

Bibliography

 
 
 
 
  
 
 
 
 

1916 ships
R-class destroyers (1916)
Ships built on the River Clyde
World War I destroyers of the United Kingdom